Edwin Walter "Ed" Skinner (February 9, 1936 – January 12, 2015) was an American politician in the state of Iowa.

From Runnells, Iowa, Skinner went to Drake University, University of Iowa, and received his law degree from Drake University Law School. He practiced law in Altoona, Iowa and was the city attorney for the cities of Altoona and Pleasant Hill, Iowa. Skinner was a Democrat who served in the Iowa House of Representatives from 1969 to 1973. He died in Des Moines, Iowa.

Notes

1936 births
2015 deaths
People from Altoona, Iowa
Drake University alumni
University of Iowa alumni
Iowa lawyers
Democratic Party members of the Iowa House of Representatives
20th-century American lawyers
Drake University Law School alumni